Camarines Sur's 3rd congressional district is one of the five congressional districts of the Philippines in the province of Camarines Sur. It has been represented in the House of Representatives since 1987. The district consists of the provincial capital Pili, its largest city Naga, and adjacent municipalities of Bombon, Calabanga, Camaligan, Canaman, Magarao and Ocampo. It is currently represented in the 19th Congress by Gabriel Bordado of the Liberal Party (LP).

Representation history

Election results

2022

2019

2016

2013

2010

See also
Legislative districts of Camarines Sur

References

Congressional districts of the Philippines
Politics of Camarines Sur
1987 establishments in the Philippines
Congressional districts of the Bicol Region
Constituencies established in 1987